The Municipal Borough of Widnes was a municipal borough centred around the town of Widnes in Lancashire, England from 1892 until 1974.

The district was abolished in 1974 under the Local Government Act 1972 when it merged with Runcorn Urban District and parts of Runcorn Rural District and Whiston Rural District to form the Borough of Halton in Cheshire.

References

History of Lancashire
Districts of England abolished by the Local Government Act 1972
Municipal boroughs of England
1892 establishments in England
Municipal Borough of